The City Planning Commission is a governmental body of Philadelphia tasked with guiding the growth and development of the city. The commission is composed of nine members which oversee a number of divisions: The Planning Division, Development Planning Division, Urban Design Division, and Geographic Information Systems Division.

References

External links
Philadelphia2035, a 25 year planned developed by the commission

Government of Philadelphia